Loknath Mahato was a Member of Legislative Assembly (MLA) in the state of Jharkhand, India, elected from constituency Barkagaon  which is in the Hazaribagh district of the state. He was first elected in 1995. Since then he has been re-elected three times, representing the Bharatiya Janata Party (BJP), one of the main national parties of India. He is one of the contenders in the 12 December 2019 state assembly elections from Bhartiya Janata Party (BJP).  

He is also popular partly thanks to his wife Molani Devi who is self-employed as an independent grocer.

References

Sources
https://web.archive.org/web/20060320103501/http://www.indian-elections.com/assembly-elections/jharkhand/result-constituencies.html
https://web.archive.org/web/20091217200627/http://www.divyabhaskar.co.in/2009/12/14/091214190018_mlas_wife_sells_vegetables_in_jharkhand.html
https://timesofindia.indiatimes.com/news/MLA-3-times-now-an-Lok-Sabha-aspirant-and-his-wife-is-a-vegetable-vendor/articleshow/32747670.cms

Living people
Members of the Jharkhand Legislative Assembly
Bharatiya Janata Party politicians from Jharkhand
All Jharkhand Students Union politicians
1945 births